Tertia is an ancient Roman name for women, in Latin it denotes a third daughter of a family

People
 Aemilia Tertia (circa 230-163 BC), wife of Scipio Africanus
 Junia Tertia (circa 60 BC-22 AD), daughter of Servilia Caepionis
 Mucia Tertia (1st century BC), daughter of Quintus Mucius Scaevola
 Licinia Tertia, (1st century BC), wife of Gaius Marius the Younger
 Tertia (actress), ancient Roman actress

Other
 , a German cargo ship in service 1922-24
 Tertia (album), the second album by American band Caspian
 The name Tertia is used to refer to Edith, one of the three Liddell Sisters (Lorina, Alice and Edith), within Lewis Carroll's  poem 'All in the golden afternoon...'. 
 Tertia, alternative name for the organ stop tierce
 Terce, third of the canonical hours

See also
 Tertulla (disambiguation), a diminutive

Roman naming conventions